Abdellatif Loudiyi is a Moroccan civil servant and politician. Since 2 August 2010, he is serving as Minister Delegate to the Head of Government, in charge of National Defense Administration (de facto defense minister), succeeding Abderrahmane Sbai. Before this appointment, he was a career civil servant who worked at the Ministry of Economy and Finance; he was General Secretary of the Ministry of Finance from 2003 to 2010.

See also
Cabinet of Morocco

References

Living people
Government ministers of Morocco
Moroccan civil servants
Year of birth missing (living people)